Croom GAA club is a Gaelic Athletic Association club located in Croom, County Limerick, Ireland. The club was founded in 1884 and fields teams in both hurling and Gaelic football.

Location
The club is situated in the parish of Croom in central County Limerick in the south division on the banks of the Maigue. Bordering clubs include Granagh/Ballingarry, Croagh/Kilfinny, Adare, Patrickswell, Crecora/Manister and Banogue. The club is roughly 20 km south of Limerick City.

History
The club was founded in 1884 as Croom Abú's and is one of the oldest clubs in the county. A direct relation of Eoin O' Farrell's was responsible for the formation of the club. Croom quickly became a force in hurling winning twenty-three West Senior Hurling titles from 1907 to 1943. During that period they also won County Senior Hurling Championships in 1908,1919,1924,1929, 1940 and 1941 along with a Junior Hurling title in 1922 and a minor in 1936. at this time they had built up a great rivalry with Ahane with whom they contested many county finals. Croom had many All-Ireland winners with Limerick in the early part of the 20th century, including Paddy Buskin in 1897, Mick Feely, Jack O'Shea and Ter Mangan in 1913, Garrett Howard, Mick Mullane and Tom Mangan, Howard, Jim Roche and Jack O'Connell in 1934, Howard and Roche in 1936 and Peter Cregan and Roche in 1940.

In 1950, the club could only field a junior hurling team and they were moved to the south division in 1956. They then won the County Junior Hurling Championship in 1965. Croom first fielded a junior football team in 1954 winning the County Championship in 1967. At this stage, football was becoming the dominant sport in the club. They went on to win seven South Senior Football titles winning County titles in 1976 and 1983 beating Oola and St. Kieran's along with several underage titles. Donal Murray was a member of the Limerick Senior Hurling team that lost the All-Ireland final to Galway in 1980. A South Senior Hurling Crown was won in 1982 but this marked the start of a barren period for the club. the mid-1990s marked an incredible revival in both codes at underage level.

The now junior hurlers won the County title in 1996 and won the Intermediate title two years later. Croom won back-to-back Minor County titles in 1996/97 and won an elusive County Under-21 title in 2001 and had several players on the All-Ireland Under-21 winning teams of 2000-02 . The footballers won a County Minor crown in 1998 and followed it up by winning the County Under-21 titles in 1999 and 2000, along with a County junior title in 1999. There was also three Croom footballers on the Limerick team that won their first ever Munster Under-21 Football Championship in 2000. This was an era of unprecedented success for Croom but they never made the breakthrough at intermediate football or senior hurling, losing an Intermediate Championship final in 2000 to Gerald Griffin's and a County Senior Hurling final in 2007 when they were beaten comfortably by Adare.

Four Croom men, Stephen Lucey, Peter Lawlor, Mark O'Riordan and Hugh Flavin, were part of the Limerick Senior Hurling team that lost the 2007 All-Ireland final. The underage success eventually wavered and throughout the late 2000s-early 2010s the club mainly fielded 13-a-side and 11 a-side teams, often amalgamating with neighbouring parishes to field a 15-a-side team. The hurlers lost their senior status in 2013 losing a relegation play-off to rivals Patrickswell and will play at premier intermediate level for 2014 for the first time since 1998. The footballers were also relegated in 2013 marking a bad year for the club. They were beaten by old rivals Gerald Griffin's in the relegation playoff.

Honours
 Limerick Senior Football Championship (2): 1976, 1983
 Limerick Senior Hurling Championship (6): 1908, 1919, 1924, 1929, 1940, 1941
 Limerick Intermediate Hurling Championship (1): 1998
 Limerick Junior Hurling Championship (3): 1922, 1965, 1996
 Limerick Junior Football Football Championship (2): 1967, 1999
 Limerick Under-21 Hurling Championship (1): 2001
 Limerick Under-21 Football Championship (2): 1999, 2000
 Limerick Minor Hurling Championship (3): 1936, 1996, 1997
 Limerick Minor Football Championship (1): 1998

Notable players
 Conor Allis
 Peter Cregan
 Hugh Flavin
 John Galvin
 Garrett Howard
 Peter Lawlor
 Stephen Lucey
 Donal Murray
 Mark O'Riordan
 Jim Roche

References
 "One Hundred Years of Glory: A History of Limerick GAA", Ó Ceallaigh, Séamus & Murphy, Seán, 1984.
 "Cromadh Abú", Croom GAA and Development Association publication, 2011.

External links
 Croom GAA site
 Limerick GAA site

Gaelic games clubs in County Limerick
Hurling clubs in County Limerick
Gaelic football clubs in County Limerick